Hunter Elizabeth may refer to:

Hunter, Elizabeth, fictional character
Hunter Elizabeth, singer on The Voice U.S. (season 4)